Joseph H. Brogan (March 30, 1880 – July 22, 1940) was an American politician from who served in the Missouri Senate.  Brogan was educated in parochial schools and at Saint Louis University.

References

1880 births
1940 deaths
Democratic Party Missouri state senators
20th-century American politicians